Kanhoji Naik-Jedhe Deshmukh was a 17th-century Marathi Sardar
, and a trusted aide of Shahaji Maharaj, and of Shahaji's son Chhatrapati Shivaji Maharaj , who founded the Maratha Empire in 1646. Kanhoji owned the entire 'Rohid Khora', which includes the forts of Raireshwar and Rohideshwar, in present-day Bhor taluka, near Pune. The administration was controlled from his native place Kaari He was respected among the Deshmukhs, noblemen in the area. Kanhoji was of the same age of Shahaji. His eldest son Baji 'Sarjerao' Jedhe was two months older than Chhatrapati Shivaji. Shahaji sent Kanhoji along with the young Shivaji Maharaj to Pune. Because of his high personal standing among the Jamindars, he helped Shivaji Maharaj in organising most of them under his banner.

His actual testing time came when Afzal Khan, a Sardar sent by Bijapur court, came to attack Chhatrapati Shivaji. Adilshah threatened all the Deshmukhs of the Maval region to support Afzal or else perish. At the behest of Shivaji Maharaj, Kanhoji convened a meeting of all the Deshmukhs (who had received similar threats from Adilshah) at his 'wadaa' at Kaari. Kanhoji not only stood by Shivaji Maharaj, but inspired and motivated all the Deshmukhs to fight for Swaraj. He played a pivotal role in planning and executing the battle of Prataapgad which eventually led to the defeat of Afzal Khan's army.  After Afzal was defeated soundly at the Battle of Pratapgad, Shivaji Maharaj honored the loyalty and bravery of Kanhoji by awarding him talwarichya pahilya panache maankari (Sword of Honour).

Kanhoji Jedhe also played a pivotal part in bringing Shivaji Maharaj back from Agra where he was under house arrest.

Descendants
In the 20th century, the descendants of Kanhoji Jedhe also played a leading role in the establishment of the State of Maharashtra; Samyukta Maharashtra Samiti, founded by Keshavrao Jedhe, led the demand for a Marathi-speaking state. Maharashtra was formed as a direct result of this Samiti; the Hutatma Chowk and Maharashtra Day commemorate the relentless efforts of the Jedhes.

Military history of India
Indian military leaders
People of the Maratha Empire
Warriors of the Maratha Empire